Antonique Smith (born August 11, 1983) is an American actress and singer.

Life and career
Smith was born in East Orange, New Jersey. She starred as Mimi in Jonathan Larson's Broadway production of Rent. She was also the poster girl for Rent, displayed on taxi cabs in New York City and posters across the country. She left the role of Mimi to record her album and expand her film career.

Smith made her television debut in Sidney Lumet's 100 Centre Street, playing a teen drug addict.

Smith played Faith Evans in Notorious, based on the life of Evans' late husband, rapper The Notorious B.I.G. She received rave reviews. The Los Angeles Times called her "delicious in the role", while Rolling Stone said she was "terrific".

Smith played CIA agent Sandra Burns in the action movie Abduction with Taylor Lautner and Alfred Molina. In the same year she played Ola O' Hara in the film Yelling to the Sky with Zoe Kravitz and Gabourey Sidibe and Jason Clarke. She had a role in the Golden Globe-nominated film Across the Universe and has guest starred on Law & Order and HBO's Bored to Death.

She starred in the TV One romantic comedy Stock Option, which premiered to record ratings for the network. She appeared in the  Netflix film Deuces and in the FOX drama series Shots Fired, executive produced by Brian Grazer and Gina Prince-Bythewood and starring Sanaa Lathan, Richard Dreyfuss, Helen Hunt, and Stephen Moyer. She starred in season 2 of the hit Netflix series Marvel's Luke Cage.

She was on the Act on Climate tour with the Hip Hop Caucus and sang for the Pope's climate rally in Washington, D.C. She was also the voice of Virgin Mobile USA.

Music
The rapper Nas mentioned Smith on his single "Nasty" that appears on his 2012 album Life Is Good. She made a cameo in the video for that song. Smith starred in Rick Ross' "Amsterdam" music video which got over 8 million views in its first two days of release. "Amsterdam" is a song from Ross's album God Forgives, I Don't.

Smith released her debut single, "Hold Up Wait a Minute (Woo Woo)" on 9:23 Music Group. The video was directed by Larenz Tate and co-stars actor Lance Gross and Vine star King Bach and was released on December 2, 2014 on Essence Online. The single was nominated for a Grammy Award for Best Traditional R&B Performance at the 57th Annual Grammy Awards.

In 2015 she released the EP Love Is Everything, which was funded by Kickstarter in 2012 and raised over $50,000 in 30 days from her fans.

She co-wrote her Grammy-nominated single and theme for the television show Shots Fired.

Filmography

Film

Television

Music videos

Broadway

References

External links
Official site

Playbill biography

Actresses from New Jersey
20th-century African-American women singers
Living people
Singers from New Jersey
Actors from East Orange, New Jersey
1983 births
African-American actresses
American stage actresses
Musicians from East Orange, New Jersey
21st-century American singers
21st-century American women singers
21st-century American actresses
21st-century African-American women singers